Corryong Airport  is a small Australian regional airport, which serves the town of Corryong in Victoria's north.

See also
 List of airports in Victoria

References

Airports in Victoria (Australia)